The Chief of General Staff (between 2019 and 2022: Commander of the Hungarian Defense Forces) is the highest-ranking military officer in the Hungarian Defence Forces and is responsible for maintaining control over the service branches.

He is responsible for development, organisation, and equipping, training and functioning of the first strategic echelon (stand-by forces) and the other strategic echelon (reserve). The Defence Forces Command coordinates the tasks of the armed forces of the Republic of Hungary, develops recommendations for the planning, organisation and supervision of the Ministry's military duties, and for the development of combat capability.

Since 2007, the Hungarian Defence Forces is under a unified command structure. The Ministry of Defence maintains the political and civilian control of the military.

On 1 January 2023 it was renamed to General Staff.

List of officeholders

Royal Hungarian Army (1922−1945)

Hungarian People's Army (1945−1990)

|-style="text-align:center;"
|colspan=7|Vacant  1946–1948
|-

Honvédség (1990−present)
The army is called Magyar Honvédség since the end of communism in Hungary.

See also
 Minister of Defence (Hungary)

References

Military of Hungary
Hungary